Gang Leader  is a 1991 Indian Telugu-language action crime film written and directed by Vijaya Bapineedu, and produced by Maganti Ravindranath Chowdary. The film stars Chiranjeevi and Vijayashanti, while Rao Gopal Rao, Anandaraj, Murali Mohan, and Sarath Kumar play supporting roles. The soundtrack was composed by Bappi Lahiri with dance choreography by Prabhu Deva. The film explores the concepts of exploitation of law enforcement by anti-social behaviour and the impact of mob psychology.

The film opened to highly positive reviews from the critics and was a major commercial success at the box office. It was screened at the International Film Festival of India. Later, it was dubbed in Tamil with the same title. The film was later remade in Hindi as Aaj Ka Goonda Raaj (1992) where Chiranjeevi reprises his role, and in Kannada as Kutumba (2003).

Plot
Raghupathi, Raghava and Rajaram are brothers. Raghupathi is the only breadwinner of the family, Raghava is preparing for the Civil Services Examination and Rajaram is an unemployed, and freelance dancer who spends time with his four friends in search of jobs. They roam in the city until midnight. Rajaram comes home at midnight and sleeps until noon; his grandmother Sabari yells at him for his irresponsibility and callousness. One day, Rajaram makes Kanyakumari vacate the house on a payment basis as she is not paying the rent to the landlord. Consequently, she barges into Rajaram's house for accommodation. At one situation, Rajaram goes to custody for money so that he can support his brother Raghava, who is in need of funding for his IAS preparation. 

Meanwhile, Ekambaram, a dreaded gangster known for contract killing, and extortion, alongside his brother Kanakambaram kill Raghupathi as he witnessed a homicide. Rajaram was spending time in prison when this incident happened. However, his friends are aware of Raghupathi's death. Rajaram, on the other hand, thinks that his brother's death was an accident. Raghava becomes an IAS officer and marries Latha, which was a scheme planned by Ekambaram and Kanakambaram so that they can escape cases with his support. Latha hates Raghava's family members, whereas Kanyakumari loves Rajaram and his family members. Meanwhile, Rajaram learns of his brother's death and begins to investigate, whereas his friends are also murdered by Ekambaram and Kanakambaram at the time. 

Rajaram is framed for his friends's death and Raghava disowns him. With Kanyakumari's help, Rajaram escapes from prison and Kanyakumari reveals that she is Ekambaram's  daughter, who ran away from home after her father killed her mother, and thus she began moving into other people's houses. After revealing this, Kanyakumari proposes to Rajaram, who accepts. Rajaram finds the evidence and goes to his brother's house, only to find that Ekambaram and Kanakambaram has held them captive. Rajaram and Kanyakumari arrives where they kill Ekambaram and Kanakambaram, and the broken family finally lead a happy life.

Cast

Soundtrack

The Music and background score was provided by Bappi Lahiri and the lyrics were penned by Veturi and Bhuvanachandra. The soundtrack was an instant hit and "Papa Rita" and "Vaana Vaana Velluvaye" were a rage in the entire state at that time.
 
Bhuvanachandra noted that "Vaana Vaana" was his first song on rain, he was initially apprehensive about writing this song since other songs of the same nature were popular. Bappi composed the tune at Suresh Guest House, initially, the tune was rejected however Bhuvan insisted that the tune should be retained. Later, the song "Vaana Vaana Velluvaye" was re-mixed by Mani Sharma for the 2012 film Rachcha.

Telugu version

Tamil version 
Lyrics written by Vairamuthu.

Reception
The movie was a huge success. It is considered to be one of the top movies in Chiranjeevi's career. This movie earned more than 70 million of Distributory Share. Gang Leader did a 162-day run at Sudharshan theatre in Hyderabad. The movie successfully completed 100 days in more than 50 theaters. The movie was dubbed into Tamil and Kannada. It was a success in those areas also.

Legacy
The classic car which was used in the movie "Citroën CX Pallas" was owned by Relangi Thirumalla Babu and was the only car of this model present in South India at that time. The car can be seen in the movie as Chiranjeevi and Vijayashanti are talking and the scene cuts to marriage and Vijayashanti commands Chiranjeevi to follow her to marriage. Video footage of the film's 100 days celebration was used in the Telugu comedy film Appula Appa Rao.

References

External links
 

Films scored by Bappi Lahiri
1990s Telugu-language films
1990s crime action films
Films set in Hyderabad, India
Films shot in Hyderabad, India
Indian crime drama films
1991 crime drama films
Indian crime action films
Fictional portrayals of the Andhra Pradesh Police
Telugu films remade in other languages
1990s action drama films
Films about corruption in India
Social realism in film
Law enforcement in fiction
Indian action drama films
1991 films
Indian gangster films
1990s masala films